Claudio Erasmo Vargas (born 9 December 1974) is a Mexican race walker.

Achievements

References

1974 births
Living people
Mexican male racewalkers
21st-century Mexican people